National Route 398 is a national highway of Japan connecting Ishinomaki, Miyagi and Yurihonjō, Akita in Japan, with a total length of 273.6 km (170.01 mi).

History
Many sections of the highway along the Sanriku Coast were inundated, destroyed, or swept away by the 2011 Tōhoku earthquake and tsunami event.

References

National highways in Japan
Roads in Akita Prefecture
Roads in Miyagi Prefecture